Pyhäjoki (literally the "Holy River") is a municipality of Finland. It is located in the defunct province of Oulu, which was split in two regions; Pyhäjoki is part of the Northern Ostrobothnia region.

The municipality is located on the Gulf of Bothnia at the mouth of the river Pyhäjoki. The municipality is unilingually Finnish.

The subject of the coat of arms of Pyhäjoki refers to the large boulder of Hanhikivi ("Goose Rock") near the mouth of the Pyhäjoki river, which was considered by the Russians at the end of the 15th century as the landmark of the Treaty of Nöteborg from 1323; a crown and cross pattern is carved into the stone as a landmark. The coat of arms was designed by Olof Eriksson and approved by the Pyhäjoki Municipal Council at its meeting on June 18, 1965. The Ministry of the Interior confirmed the use of the coat of arms on September 22 of the same year.

Fennovoima, a Finnish nuclear power company, plans to build a nuclear power plant at Hanhikivi in the municipality. The power plant would be operational in 2029.

References

External links

Municipality of Pyhäjoki – Official website

 
Populated coastal places in Finland
Populated places established in 1865